The 2018 Thai League 3 (known as the Omsin League Pro for sponsorship reasons) football season will be the second season of Thai League 3. 31 clubs will be divided into 2 groups (regions).

Changes from last season

Team changes

Promoted clubs

Promoted to the 2018 Thai League 2
 Samut Sakhon
 Khonkaen
 Udon Thani

Promoted from the 2017 Thai League 4
 BTU United
 JL Chiangmai United
 Chiangrai City
 Muangkan United
 Marines Eureka

Relegated clubs

Relegated to the 2018 Thai League 4 Northern Region
 Singburi Bangrajun

Relegated to the 2018 Thai League 4 Western Region
 Krung Thonburi

Relegated from the 2017 Thai League 2
 Bangkok
 Songkhla United

Renamed clubs
 Banbueng authorize from Phuket City because Banbueng is an absolute football club quota.
 Bangkok University Deffo was renamed to Deffo
 Nakhon Si Thammarat Unity was renamed to WU Nakhon Si United

Expansion clubs

 Songkhla United and Krung Thonburi Club-licensing football club didn't pass to play 2018 Thai League 3 Lower Region. This team is banned 2 years and Relegated to 2020 Thai League 4 Southern Region for Songkhla United, 2020 Thailand Amateur League Bangkok Metropolitan Region for Krung Thonburi .

Withdrawn clubs
 Amnat United and Phayao were taking a 2-years break. This team is automatically banned 2 years, don't get subsidy and relegated to 2020 Thai League 4 Northern Region for Phayao, 2020 Thai League 4 North Eastern Region for Amnat United.

2018 Thai League 3 locations

Stadium and locations (Upper Region)

Stadium and locations (Lower Region)

Results

League table (Upper Region)

League table (Lower Region)

Third place play-off
This round was featured by Ayutthaya United, the second place of 2018 Thai League 3 Upper Region and Nara United, the second place of 2018 Thai League 3 Lower Region. Winners of third place play-off would promoted to 2019 Thai League 2.

Summary

Matches

Ayutthaya United won 2–1 on aggregate.

Final
This round was featured by JL Chiangmai United, the first place of 2018 Thai League 3 Upper Region and MOF Customs United, the first place of 2018 Thai League 3 Lower Region. Both winners and runners-up would promoted to 2019 Thai League 2 automatically.

Summary

Matches

JL Chiangmai United won 2–0 on aggregate.

See also
 2018 Thai League 1
 2018 Thai League 2
 2018 Thai League 4
 2018 Thailand Amateur League
 2018 Thai FA Cup
 2018 Thai League Cup
 2018 Thailand Champions Cup
 2018 Thai League 3 Upper Region
 2018 Thai League 3 Lower Region

References

External links

Thai League 3
2018 in Thai football leagues